Willy Rosen (1894 – 1 October 1944) was a German-Jewish composer, songwriter, and renowned cabaret player. Rosen was killed in the Auschwitz concentration camp on 1 October 1944.

Rosen was born Willy Julius Rosenbaum in Magdeburg, Germany. In 1942, Rosen was incarcerated in the Westerbork transit camp, and in 1944 deported to Theresienstadt on 4 September 1944 and then on to the Auschwitz concentration camp on 29 September, where he died.

Selected filmography
 Marriage in Trouble (1929)
 The Tender Relatives (1930)
 Moritz Makes his Fortune (1931)
 Holzapfel Knows Everything (1932)
 Manolescu, Prince of Thieves (1933)

Notes

Sources
Smelik, K. A. D.; Pomerans, Arnold, Etty: The Letters and Diaries of Etty Hillesum, 1941-1943, William B. Eerdmans Publishing Company, 2002. 
Silverman, Jerry, The Undying Flame: Ballads and Songs of the Holocaust, Syracuse University Press, 2002. 
Proceedings of the Ninth World Congress of Jewish Studies , Part 4, World Union of Jewish Studies, 1986

1894 births
1944 deaths
Jewish cabaret performers
Musicians from Magdeburg
German cabaret performers
German composers
German songwriters
Jewish composers
Jewish songwriters
German civilians killed in World War II
German people who died in Auschwitz concentration camp
20th-century German musicians
German Jews who died in the Holocaust